The following is a list of public housing estates in Tai Po, Hong Kong, including Home Ownership Scheme (HOS), Private Sector Participation Scheme (PSPS), Sandwich Class Housing Scheme (SCHS), Flat-for-Sale Scheme (FFSS), and Tenants Purchase Scheme (TPS) estates.

Overview

Chung Nga Court

Chung Nga Court is a Home Ownership Scheme estate in the north of Tai Po, located near Fu Heng Estate. It comprises three residential buildings built in 1991.

Elegance Garden

Elegance Garden is a Private Sector Participation Scheme estate in Tai Po, near Uptown Plaza, Wan Tau Tong Estate and MTR Tai Po Market station. It was jointly developed by the Hong Kong Housing Authority and Chevalier Group. It has four blocks built in 1990.

Fu Heng Estate

Fu Heng Estate is a mixed estate consisting of 8 residential buildings completed in 1990. Some of the flats were sold to tenants through Tenants Purchase Scheme Phase 3 in 2000.

Fu Shin Estate

Fu Shin Estate is a mixed public housing and TPS estate, built on the reclaimed land of Tai Po Hoi. The estate consists of six residential blocks completed in 1985. In 2005, some of the flats were sold to tenants through Tenants Purchase Scheme Phase 6B.

Lift plunge incident
On 25 October 2008, a lift at Shin Nga House, Fu Shin Estate suddenly plunged 14 storeys, but no one was injured. This raised concerns on lift safety. The government later confirmed the incident was caused by the failure of the counterweight pulley bearing, which caused the dislodgement of all eight suspension ropes from the counterweight.

Fu Tip Estate

Fu Tip Estate is a public housing estate in Tai Po, New Territories, Hong Kong near Fu Heng Estate and Tai Po Hospital. The housing estate will be completed in phases between 2021,2023 and 2030.

King Nga Court / Tak Nga Court / Yat Nga Court

The three HOS estates, King Nga Court, Tak Nga Court and Yat Nga Court, are built near Wan Tau Tong Estate between 1991 and 1992.

Kwong Fuk Estate

Kwong Fuk Estate is the second public housing estate in Tai Po. Built at the reclaimed land at the east of Tai Po Old Market near Yuen Chau Tsai, the estate consists of eight residential buildings completed in 1983.

Ming Nga Court

Ming Nga Court is a Home Ownership Scheme estate in Tai Po, located at the reclaimed land of Tai Po Hoi next to Fu Shin Estate and Yee Nga Court. It was developed by Hong Kong Housing Authority in 1985.

Po Heung Estate

Po Heung Estate is a public housing estate in Po Heung Street, Tai Po, which has 2 blocks with totally 483 flats. Its location was formerly the office of Tai Po Rural Committee and Tai Po Temporary Market. It was completed in 2016.

Po Nga Court

Po Nga Court is a HOS estate near Tai Wo Estate, which has 3 residential buildings completed in 1989.

Sun Hing Garden

Sun Hing Garden is a Private Sector Participation Scheme estate in Tai Po, near Fu Shin Estate, Chung Nga Court, Ming Nga Court. Built on the reclaimed land of Tai Po Hoi, the estate consists of 5 blocks built in 1986.

Tai Po Plaza

Tai Po Plaza is a Private Sector Participation Scheme estate in Tai Po, near Tai Po Centre, Tai Yuen Estate, Fortune Plaza and Tai Po Centre Bus Terminus. It was jointly developed by the Hong Kong Housing Authority and Shui On Group. It has totally 5 blocks completed in 1985.

Tai Wo Estate

Tai Wo Estate consists of 9 residential buildings completed in 1989. It is one of the public housing estates in Tai Po that is not built on the reclaimed land. Some of the flats were sold to tenants through Tenants Purchase Scheme Phase 3 in 2000.

Tai Yuen Estate

Tai Yuen Estate is the first public housing estate in Tai Po, located at the town centre of Tai Po New Town. It is built on the reclaimed land of Tai Po Hoi, the estate consists of 7 residential blocks completed in 1980.

Ting Nga Court

Ting Nga Court is a Home Ownership Scheme estate in Tai Po, near Tai Yuen Estate. Built on the reclaimed land of Tai Po Hoi, It consists of 3 blocks completed in 1981.

Wan Tau Tong Estate

Wan Tau Tong Estate is the second last public housing estate in Tai Po, but it is not built on the reclaimed land. The estate consists of 3 residential buildings completed in 1991. Some of the flats were sold to tenants through Tenants Purchase Scheme Phase 1 in 1998.

Wang Fuk Court

Wang Fuk Court is a HOS estate in Tai Po, near Kwong Fuk Estate. It has 8 residential buildings, offering 1,987 units and built in 1983.

Yee Nga Court

Yee Nga Court is a Home Ownership Scheme estate in Tai Po, located at the reclaimed land of Tai Po Hoi next to Fu Shin Estate and Ming Nga Court. It was developed by Hong Kong Housing Authority in 1993.

See also
 Public housing in Hong Kong
 List of public housing estates in Hong Kong

References

Tai Po